Field Of Glass by The Triffids was released as a 12" extended play in 1985. All three tracks were generally recorded live at BBC Studio 5, Maida Vale, London. The EP was produced by Mark Radcliffe, engineered by Mike Robinson, engineered by Owen Davies and remixed by Nick Cook at Townhouse 3.

Details
The first two songs, "Bright Lights, Big City" and "Monkey On My Back", deal directly with David McComb’s drug abuse

and are infused with bitterness and desperation. The song which gave its name to the EP tells the tale of a loner who has some unrequited love issues with a rich girl who’s just finished school. He pleads with her to ride with him on a baking hot summer's night and she goes along. Driven mad by the intolerable heat and by her rejection he murders her. This song was originally two songs - "Field of Glass" and "Pleasure Slide".

McComb later said, "When we got to London I think we sort of felt we had to make a kind of statement. We recorded the Field of Glass EP just when we got there, which is still I guess the most aggressive and violent record that we had done. It gave us heaps of confidence."

"Evil" Graham Lee noted the EP was, "a psychodrama from beginning to end, with a ferocious, partly improvised maelstrom of a sound to match the tortured, twisted and sometimes very funny lyrics. Nothing The Triffids had done to this point could have prepared listeners for the onslaught of Field Of Glass."

Track listing 
All tracks written by David McComb.

 "Bright Lights, Big City" 
 "Monkey on My Back" 
 "Field of Glass"

Personnel

The Triffids
Credited to:
 David McComb - vocals, guitar
 Robert McComb - guitar, percussion, vocals
 Alsy MacDonald - drums, vocals
 Martyn Casey (aka Daubney Carshott) - bass
 Jill Birt - keyboard

Notes

1985 EPs
The Triffids EPs